The Huawei U8800 Ideos X5 is a touchscreen mobile phone running Android, and which targets the mid-high phone market. It has a typical Android design. It is available for AT&T and runs on 3G.

See also
 Galaxy Nexus
 Emotion UI
 List of Android devices

External links

 

Android (operating system) devices
Huawei smartphones
Discontinued smartphones